The Pontiac Trophy 4 engine (also called the Indianapolis 4, or Indy 4) is a  inline four-cylinder engine produced by the Pontiac Motor Division of General Motors for model years 1961 through 1963. Created from one bank of Pontiac's powerful  Trophy V8, its only application was in the first generation Pontiac Tempest. It was dubbed by Pontiac the Trophy 4, playing off the racing success that had earned the 389 V8 engine the nickname Trophy V-8 after just two years of competition.

History
The Trophy 4 engine is a short-stroke, 45-degree inclined inline four created from the right bank of the 389 V8 for the debut of the Tempest in 1961. It shared most of the 389's tooling and up to 120 of its parts. This degree of commonality enabled it to be produced on the same lines as the V8, allowing substantial cost savings.

The Tempest's drivetrain features a rear-mounted transaxle connected to the engine via a torque tube, giving the car a near-perfect 50-50 front-rear weight balance. As the driveshaft runs at engine speed, rather than the transmission output speed, it runs at a higher speed and lower torque than a conventional driveshaft for a rear wheel drive car. This allows it to be an unusually small  solid rotating shaft, inside the pressed steel square torque tube. Uniquely, the shaft is also bent downwards into a curve, which has the effect of making the critical speed of such a flexible shaft higher than the engine's maximum rpm! The curve of this flexible, thin driveshaft earned it the nickname "rope drive".

A downside of the Trophy 4 is engine vibration, as an inline four-cylinder engine suffers from inherent secondary imbalance resulting from its 180 degree crankshaft. The Trophy 4 is cushioned by flexible rubber engine mounts designed to isolate the engine from the rest of the car, and its forces are further damped by the Tempest's unusual drivetrain that distributes these forces through the torque tube to the rear-mounted transaxle. The timing chain in the Trophy 4 was originally the same as the 389, but was prone to stretch and break from engine vibration; a special high-strength version was developed as a replacement. 

The Trophy 4 was dropped from the Tempest line when it upgraded from a compact to an intermediate for the 1964 model year.

See also
 Iron Duke engine
 Pontiac straight-6 engine
 Pontiac straight-8 engine
 Pontiac V8 engine

References

Pontiac engines
Slant-four engines
Straight-four engines